89.5 Lamrag Radio (DYAW 89.5 MHz) is an FM station owned and operated by Aliw Broadcasting Corporation. Its studios and transmitter are located along San Francisco St. cor. Texas St., V&G Subd., Tacloban.

References

External links
 Lamrag Radio FB Page
 Lamrag Radio Live Streaming

Radio stations in Tacloban
Radio stations established in 2019